Angel's dwarf gecko (Lygodactylus decaryi) is a species of lizard in the family Gekkonidae. The species is endemic to Madagascar.

Etymology
The specific name, decaryi, is in honor of French botanist Raymond Decary.

Geographic range
L. decaryi is found in southern Madagascar.

Habitat

Reproduction
L. decaryi is oviparous.

References

Further reading
Angel F (1930). "Sur un lézard nouveau de Madagascar, appartenant au genre Lygodactylus. (Matériaux de la mission R. Decary, en 1926)". Bulletin de la Société Zoologique de France 55: 253–255. (Lygodactylus decaryi, new species). (in French).
Glaw F, Vences M (2006). A Field Guide to Amphibians and Reptiles of Madagascar, Third Edition. Cologne, Germany: Vences & Glaw Verlag. 496 pp. .
Puente M, Glaw F, Vieites DR, Vences M (2009). "Review of the systematics, morphology and distribution of Malagasy dwarf geckos, genera Lygodactylus and Microscalabotes (Squamata: Gekkonidae)". Zootaxa 2103: 1–76. (Lygodactylus decaryi, p. 51).
Rösler H (2000). "Kommentierte Liste der rezent, subrezent und fossil bekannten Geckotaxa (Reptilia: Gekkonomorpha)". Gekkota 2: 28–153. (Lygodactylus decaryi, p. 92). (in German).

Lygodactylus
Reptiles described in 1930
Reptiles of Madagascar
Endemic fauna of Madagascar
Taxa named by Fernand Angel